Thalassomya bureni is a species of midges in the family Chironomidae.

References

Further reading

External links

 Diptera.info

Chironomidae
Insects described in 1949